Concept creep is the process by which harm-related topics experience semantic expansion to include topics which would not have originally been envisaged to be included under that label. It was first identified by Nick Haslam in 2016, who identified its effects on the concepts of abuse, bullying, trauma, mental disorder, addiction, and prejudice. Others have identified its effects on terms like gaslight and emotional labour. The phenomenon can be related to the concept of hyperbole.

It has been criticised for making people more sensitive to harms and for blurring people's thinking and understanding of such terms, by categorising too many things together which should not be, and by losing the clarity and specificity of a term. 

Although the initial research on concept creep has focused on concepts central to the political left's ideology, psychologists have also found evidence that people identifying with the political right have more expansive interpretations of concepts central to their own ideology (ex. sexual deviance, personal responsibility and terrorism).

See Also 

 Euphemism treadmill
 Victim mentality

References 

Definition
Moral psychology
Psychopathology
Suffering